Tobias John Harris (born July 15, 1992) is an American professional basketball player for the Philadelphia 76ers of the National Basketball Association (NBA). He played one season of college basketball for the Tennessee Volunteers before declaring for the 2011 NBA draft where he was drafted 19th overall by the Charlotte Bobcats and then traded to the Milwaukee Bucks. Harris has also played for the Orlando Magic, Detroit Pistons and Los Angeles Clippers.

High school career
Harris attended Half Hollow Hills High School West and joined the varsity basketball team as an eighth grader. He played at Half Hollow Hills West until 2008 when he transferred to Long Island Lutheran Middle and High School in Brookville, New York for his junior year. He then transferred back to Half Hollow Hills West for his senior year and went on to earn the 2010 Mr. New York Basketball award. He was also named a 2010 McDonald's All-American. Harris played 66 total games at Half Hollow Hills High School and averaged 24.9 points per game, 2.0 assists per game, and 9.9 rebounds per game.

|-
| colspan="7" style="padding-left:10px;" | Overall recruiting rankings: Rivals: No. 7,  Scout: No. 4,  ESPN: No. 6
|}

College career
Harris played for the Tennessee Volunteers as a freshman in 2010–11 for coach Bruce Pearl. He played the point forward position, a mix between forward and point guard, in Pearl's offense. A USBWA Freshman All-America second-team selection and one of the nation's most consistent and versatile performers, Harris also was named second-team All-SEC by the league's head coaches and earned a spot on the SEC All-Freshman Team. He ranked fifth among all freshmen in the six major conferences with 15.3 points per game. In addition, his 7.3 rebounds per game ranked sixth among all major-conference freshmen.

On May 9, 2011, Harris declared for the NBA draft, forgoing his final three years of college eligibility.

Professional career

Milwaukee Bucks (2011–2013)
On June 23, 2011, Harris was selected with the 19th overall pick in the 2011 NBA draft by the Charlotte Bobcats. He was later traded to the Milwaukee Bucks on draft night. On December 10, 2011, he signed his rookie scale contract with the Bucks. Harris made his NBA debut on January 7, 2012, against the Los Angeles Clippers before tallying a team-high 15 points a night later against the Phoenix Suns on January 8. He appeared in 42 games during his rookie season (nine starts), averaging 5.0 points, 2.4 rebounds and 0.5 assists in 11.4 minutes per game.

On October 24, 2012, the Bucks exercised their third-year team option on Harris' rookie scale contract, extending the contract through the 2013–14 season.

Orlando Magic (2013–2016)

On February 21, 2013, Harris was traded, along with Doron Lamb and Beno Udrih, to the Orlando Magic in exchange for JJ Redick, Gustavo Ayón and Ish Smith. Harris' playing time saw a notable increase in Orlando, and his stats followed suit. Harris more than tripled his points per game average, and more than quadrupled his rebounds, assists and blocks per game.

On October 26, 2013, the Magic exercised their fourth-year team option on Harris' rookie scale contract, extending the contract through the 2014–15 season.

On January 24, 2014, Harris recorded 28 points and a career-high 20 rebounds in a 114–105 win over the Los Angeles Lakers. On March 2, 2014, he scored a career-high 31 points in a 92–81 win over the Philadelphia 76ers.

On February 6, 2015, Harris set a new career high with 34 points in a 103–97 win over the Los Angeles Lakers.

On July 14, 2015, Harris re-signed with the Magic to a four-year, $64 million contract.

Detroit Pistons (2016–2018)

On February 16, 2016, Harris was traded to the Detroit Pistons in exchange for Ersan İlyasova and Brandon Jennings. He made his debut for the Pistons three days later, scoring 21 points off the bench in a 98–86 loss to the Washington Wizards. The Pistons finished the regular season as the eighth seed in the Eastern Conference with a 44–38 record, earning a playoff berth for the first time since 2009. However, in their first-round series against the first-seeded Cleveland Cavaliers, the Pistons were swept 4–0.

On December 23, 2016, Harris came off the bench for the first time in 2016–17 and subsequently scored a season-high 26 points in a 119–113 loss to the Golden State Warriors. On March 11, 2017, he set a new season high with 28 points in a 112–92 win over the New York Knicks.

On October 25, 2017, Harris matched a career high with 34 points in a 122–101 win over the Minnesota Timberwolves. On November 13, 2017, he was named Eastern Conference Player of the Week for games played from Monday November 6 to Sunday November 12. On December 26, 2017, he scored 21 of his 30 points in the first quarter of the Pistons' 107–83 win over the Indiana Pacers.

Los Angeles Clippers (2018–2019)
On January 29, 2018, Harris, along with Avery Bradley, Boban Marjanović, a future protected first-round draft pick and a future second-round draft pick, was traded to the Los Angeles Clippers in exchange for Blake Griffin, Willie Reed and Brice Johnson. He made his debut for the Clippers on February 3, scoring 24 points in a 113–103 win over the Chicago Bulls. On February 23, 2018, he recorded 30 points and 12 rebounds in a 128–117 win over the Phoenix Suns.

On November 15, 2018, Harris scored 18 points in a 116–111 win over the San Antonio Spurs, thus scoring at least 15 points in a career-best 14 straight games. On November 25, he had 34 points and 11 rebounds in a 104–100 win over the Portland Trail Blazers. He was subsequently named Western Conference Player of the Week for games played Monday, November 19, through Sunday, November 25. It was his second career Player of the Week award. He also earned Western Conference Player of the Month for October and November, the first career Player of the Month honor of his career. On December 17, he scored a career-high 39 points in a 131–127 loss to the Trail Blazers. On January 20, he had 27 points, nine rebounds and nine assists in a 103–95 win over the Spurs.

Philadelphia 76ers (2019–present) 
On February 6, 2019, Harris was traded, along with Boban Marjanović and Mike Scott, to the Philadelphia 76ers in exchange for Wilson Chandler, Mike Muscala, Landry Shamet and a number of future draft picks. He made his debut for the 76ers two days later, recording 14 points and eight rebounds in a 117–110 win over the Denver Nuggets. On July 6, 2019, the Sixers re-signed Harris to a five-year, $180 million contract.

On January 4, 2021, Harris was named the Eastern Conference Player of the Week. On January 6, Harris scored his 10,000th career point in a game against the Washington Wizards. On January 27, 2021, Harris hit a game-winning pull-up jump shot with 3.7 seconds left to help the 76ers hold off a comeback by the Los Angeles Lakers in a 107–106 victory.

On April 16, 2022, during Game 1 of the first round of the playoffs, Harris logged 26 points and six assists in a 131–111 win over the Toronto Raptors.

Career statistics

NBA

Regular season

|-
| style="text-align:left;"|
| style="text-align:left;"|Milwaukee
| 42 || 9 || 11.4 || .467 || .261 || .815 || 2.4 || .5 || .3 || .2 || 5.0
|-
| style="text-align:left;"rowspan=2 |
| style="text-align:left;"|Milwaukee
| 28 || 14 || 11.6 || .461 || .333 || .885 || 2.0 || .5 || .3 || .3 || 4.9
|-
| style="text-align:left;"|Orlando
| 27 || 20 || 36.1 || .453 || .310 || .721 || 8.5 || 2.1 || .9 || 1.4 || 17.3
|-
| style="text-align:left;"|
| style="text-align:left;"|Orlando
| 61 || 36 || 30.3 || .464 || .254 || .807 || 7.0 || 1.3 || .7 || .4 || 14.6
|-
| style="text-align:left;"|
| style="text-align:left;"|Orlando
| 68 || 63 || 34.8 || .466 || .364 || .788 || 6.3 || 1.8 || 1.0 || .5 || 17.1
|-
| style="text-align:left;"rowspan=2 |
| style="text-align:left;"|Orlando
| 49 || 49 || 32.9 || .464 || .311 || .784 || 7.0 || 2.0 || 1.0 || .6 || 13.7
|-
| style="text-align:left;"|Detroit
| 27 || 25 || 33.4 || .477 || .375 || .911 || 6.2 || 2.6 || .7 || .4 || 16.6
|-
| style="text-align:left;"|
| style="text-align:left;"|Detroit
| 82 || 48 || 31.3 || .481 || .347 || .841 || 5.1 || 1.7 || .7 || .5 || 16.1
|-
| style="text-align:left;"rowspan=2 |
| style="text-align:left;"|Detroit
| 48 || 48 || 32.6 || .451 || .409 || .846 || 5.1 || 2.0 || .7 || .3 || 18.1
|-
| style="text-align:left;"|L.A. Clippers
| 32 || 32 || 34.5 || .473 || .414 || .800 || 6.0 || 3.1 || 1.2 || .6 || 19.3
|-
| style="text-align:left;"rowspan=2 |
| style="text-align:left;"|L.A. Clippers
| 55 || 55 || 34.6 || .496 || .434 || .877 || 7.9 || 2.7 || .7 || .4 || 20.9
|-
| style="text-align:left;"|Philadelphia
| 27 || 27 || 35.0 || .469 || .326 || .841 || 7.9 || 2.9 || .4 || .5 || 18.2
|-
| style="text-align:left;"|
| style="text-align:left;"|Philadelphia
| 72 || 72 || 34.3 || .471 || .367 || .806 || 6.9 || 3.2 || .7 || .6 || 19.6
|-
| style="text-align:left;"|
| style="text-align:left;"|Philadelphia
| 62 || 62 || 32.5 || .512 || .394 || .892 || 6.8 || 3.5 || .9 || .8 || 19.5
|-
| style="text-align:left;"|
| style="text-align:left;"|Philadelphia
| 73 || 73 || 34.8 || .482 || .367 || .842 || 6.8 || 3.5 || .6 || .6 || 17.2
|- class="sortbottom"
| style="text-align:center;" colspan="2"|Career
| 753 || 633 || 31.4 || .476 || .367 || .828 || 6.2 || 2.3 || .7 || .5 || 16.4

Playoffs

|-
| style="text-align:left;"|2016
| style="text-align:left;"|Detroit
| 4 || 4 || 39.0 || .457 || .333 || .923 || 9.5 || 3.0 || .8 || .8 || 14.5
|-
| style="text-align:left;"|2019
| style="text-align:left;"|Philadelphia
| 12 || 12 || 36.9 || .425 || .349 || .846 || 9.1 || 4.0 || 1.1 || .5 || 15.5
|-
| style="text-align:left;"|2020
| style="text-align:left;"|Philadelphia
| 4 || 4 || 37.0 || .383 || .133 || .789 || 9.5 || 4.0 || .5 || .3 || 15.8
|-
| style="text-align:left;"|2021
| style="text-align:left;"|Philadelphia
| 12 || 12 || 36.5 || .488 || .372 || .875 || 8.5 || 3.5 || 1.0 || .4 || 21.8
|-
| style="text-align:left;"|2022
| style="text-align:left;"|Philadelphia
| 12 || 12 || 38.8 || .500 || .386 || .864 || 7.6 || 2.9 || 1.1 || .8 || 16.9
|- class="sortbottom"
| style="text-align:center;" colspan="2"|Career
| 44 || 44 || 37.5 || .463 || .347 || .858 || 8.6 || 3.5 || 1.0 || .6 || 17.5

College

|-
| style="text-align:left;"|2010–11
| style="text-align:left;"|Tennessee
| 34 || 33 || 29.2 || .460 || .303 || .753 || 7.3 || 1.3 || .7 || .9 || 15.3

Personal life

Harris was born to parents Torrel and Lisa, in Islip, New York. His father played college basketball at Duquesne and Murray State. He has three brothers, Tyler, T.J. and Terry, and two sisters, Tori and Tesia. Fellow NBA player and former teammate Channing Frye is Harris's first cousin. His grandfather, John Mulzac, was a member of the Tuskegee Airmen. Harris wears number 12 as a tribute to his close friend and former teammate Morgan Childs, who died at age 17 from leukemia.

Harris is close friends with Houston Rockets center Boban Marjanović, who was his teammate in Detroit, Los Angeles, and Philadelphia from 2016 to 2019.

Harris is married.

Philanthropy 
Harris was the recipient of the 2016 NBA Community Service Award. He created the "Tobias Harris School of Mentoring Program" and partnered with the Yes We Can Community Center and UAS Inc to help athletes and their parents with the recruiting and scholarship process. Harris also donated $10,000 to "Feeding Children Everywhere", a social charity that helps prepare food for hungry children. Harris won this award again in October 2021. 

Harris launched the Tobias Lit Labs campaign which brings books and authors to families and schools. He also partnered with Read by 4th to have a block party in North Philadelphia. Harris contributed more than 2 million dollars through his Tobias Harris Charitable Fund, which provides classroom supplies and supports professional development for educators and students. He has donated $10,000 to the Kappa Alpha Psi Foundation to provide grants for scholarships, community projects, and after-school programs.

Spirituality 
Harris identifies as a Christian and discusses his faith in public often. In 2015 in an interview with "Razz and Jazz Sports", Tobias stated, "Any person I meet, I try to embrace them and show them love so that they know I'm a Christian, Jesus Christ was a loving man. And as Christians, we have to try to model our lives after Jesus Christ". Tobias donated another 1 million dollars to nine different charities to the Philadelphia area.

Endorsements 
On July 6, 2019 Harris signed a 5-year, 180 million-dollar deal with the Philadelphia 76ers.  He has many off-court endorsements including Nike, Off-White Damari Savile, Ovadia & Sons, and more.

Fitness and nutrition 
Harris is interested in working out and staying healthy. He said, "I am a workout guy. I like it all. It gives me an advantage, and I like to put in a lot of extra work". Harris does a lot of squats and many other lower-body exercises. He likes to bench press and powerlifting. His diet is also important to him. He likes fruits and vegetables, chicken and turkey, and sometimes red meat.

References

External links

Official website

1992 births
Living people
African-American basketball players
American men's basketball players
Basketball players from New York (state)
Charlotte Bobcats draft picks
Detroit Pistons players
Los Angeles Clippers players
McDonald's High School All-Americans
Milwaukee Bucks players
Orlando Magic players
Parade High School All-Americans (boys' basketball)
People from Dix Hills, New York
People from Islip (town), New York
Philadelphia 76ers players
Power forwards (basketball)
Small forwards
Sportspeople from Suffolk County, New York
Tennessee Volunteers basketball players
21st-century African-American sportspeople